Aller is a surname. Notable people with the surname include:
 Arvo Aller (born 1973), Estonian politician
 Carl Aller (1845–1926), Danish magazine publisher
 Eleanor Aller, later Slatkin, née Altschuler, (1917–1995), American cellist
  (born 1947), German politician 
 Laura Aller (1849–1917), Danish magazine editor and publisher
 Lawrence H. Aller (1913–2003), American astronomer
 Rodney Aller (1916–2005), American lawyer, naval officer and masters skier
 Victor Aller (1905–1977), American pianist

See also 
 Allers (surname)
 Aller (disambiguation)